Ambrose Edward Barlow, O.S.B. (1585 – 10 September 1641) was an English Benedictine monk who is venerated as a saint in the Catholic Church. He is one of a group of saints canonized by Pope Paul VI who became known as the Forty Martyrs of England and Wales.

Early life and education

Ambrose was born at Barlow Hall, Chorlton-cum-Hardy, near Manchester in 1585 (in the parish of Manchester). He was the fourth son of the nobleman Sir Alexander Barlow and his wife Mary, daughter of Sir Urian Brereton of Handforth Hall. The Barlow family had been reluctant converts to the Church of England following the suppression of the Catholic Church in England and Wales. Ambrose's grandfather died in 1584 whilst imprisoned for his beliefs and Sir Alexander Barlow had two thirds of his estate confiscated as a result of his refusing to conform with the rules of the new established religion. On 30 November 1585, Ambrose was baptised at Didsbury Chapel and his baptism entry reads "Edwarde legal sonne of Alex' Barlowe gent' 30".  Ambrose went on to adhere to the Anglican faith until 1607, when he converted to Roman Catholicism.

In 1597, Ambrose was taken into the stewardship of Sir Uryan Legh, a relative who would care for him whilst he served out his apprenticeship as a page. However, upon completing this service, Barlow realised that his true vocation was for the priesthood, so he travelled to Douai in France to study at the English College there before attending the Royal College of Saint Alban in Valladolid, Spain. In 1615, he returned to Douai where he became a member of the Order of Saint Benedict, joining the community of St Gregory the Great (now Downside Abbey), and was ordained as a priest in 1617.

Mission

After his ordination into the priesthood, Ambrose returned to Barlow Hall, before taking up residence at the home of Sir Thomas Tyldesley, Morleys Hall, Astley. Sir Thomas' grandmother had arranged for a pension to be made available to the priest which would enable him to carry out his priestly duties amongst the poor Catholics within his parish. From there he secretly catered for the needs of Catholic 'parishioners', offering daily Mass and reciting his Office and Rosary for the next twenty-four years. To avoid detection by the Protestant authorities, he devised a four-week routine in which he travelled throughout the parish for four weeks and then remained within the Hall for five weeks. He would often visit his cousins, the Downes, at their residence of Wardley Hall and conduct Mass for the gathered congregation.

Arrest and execution
Ambrose was arrested four times during his travels and released without charge. King Charles I signed a proclamation on 7 March 1641, which decreed that all priests should leave the country within one calendar month or face being arrested and treated as traitors, resulting in imprisonment or death. Ambrose's parishioners implored him to flee or at least go into hiding but he refused. Their fears were compounded by a recent stroke which had resulted in the 56-year-old priest being partially paralysed. "Let them fear that have anything to lose which they are unwilling to part with", he told them.

On 25 April 1641, Easter Day, Ambrose and his congregation of around 150 people were surrounded at Morleys Hall, Astley by the Vicar of Leigh and his armed congregation of some 400. Father Ambrose surrendered, and his parishioners were released after their names had been recorded. The priest was restrained, then taken on a horse with a man behind him to prevent his falling, and escorted by a band of sixty people to the Justice of the Peace at Winwick, before being transported to Lancaster Castle.

Father Ambrose appeared before the presiding judge, Sir Robert Heath, on 7 September when he professed his adherence to the Catholic faith and defended his actions. On 8 September, the feast of the Nativity of Mary, Sir Robert Heath found Ambrose guilty and sentenced him to be executed. Two days later, he was taken from Lancaster Castle, drawn on a hurdle to the place of execution, hanged, dismembered, quartered, and boiled in oil. His head was afterwards exposed on a pike.
His cousin, Francis Downes, Lord of Wardley Hall, a devout Catholic rescued his skull and preserved it at Wardley where it remains to this day. It is not the skull of Roger Downes of that same family, the libertine and friend of the Earl of Rochester.

When the news of his death and martyrdom reached his Benedictine brothers at Douai Abbey, a Mass of Thanksgiving and the Te Deum were ordered to be sung.

Canonisation
On 15 December 1929, Pope Pius XI proclaimed Father Ambrose as Blessed at his Beatification ceremony at St. Peter's Basilica, Vatican City. In recognition of the large number of British Catholic martyrs who were executed during the Reformation, most during the reign of Elizabeth I, Pope Paul VI decreed that on 25 October 1970 he was canonising a number of people who were to be known as the Forty Martyrs of England and Wales of whom Ambrose was one.

Hagiography and relics

Challoner (see below) compiled Barlow's biography from two manuscripts belonging to St Gregory's Monastery, one of which was written by his brother Dom Rudesind Barlow, President of the English Benedictine Congregation. A third manuscript, titled "The Apostolical Life of Ambrose Barlow", was written by one of his pupils for Dom Rudesind, and is in the John Rylands Library, Manchester; it has been printed by the Chetham Society.

Two portraits of Barlow and one of his father, Sir Alexander, are known to exist.

Several relics of Ambrose are also preserved; his jaw bone is held at the Church of St Ambrose of Milan, Barlow Moor, Manchester; one of his hands is preserved at Stanbrook Abbey now at Wass, North Yorkshire, and another hand is at Mount Angel Abbey in St. Benedict, Oregon; and his skull is preserved on the stairwell at Wardley Hall in Worsley, the one time home of the Downes family, and now the home of the Catholic Bishop of Salford.

Legacy

The church of St Ambrose of Milan at Barlow Moor is in the parish of his birthplace. It was founded in 1932, and is dedicated to St Ambrose of Milan but changed to St Ambrose Barlow at his canonisation. St Ambrose Barlow Roman Catholic church and primary school in Astley is also named after Ambrose.

Other schools named after the saint include The Barlow Roman Catholic High School in Didsbury, St Ambrose Barlow Roman Catholic High School in Swinton near Manchester, and St Ambrose Barlow Catholic High School in Netherton, Merseyside. One of the boarding houses at Downside School is named Barlow in his honour.

An Oblate Chapter (association of secular Benedictines) of Douai Abbey, meeting at St Anne's Roman Catholic Church in Ormskirk, has St Ambrose Barlow as its patron.

References

Further reading
Allanson, Biographical MSS. (preserved at Ampleforth Abbey): MS. I
Butler, Alban (2000) Lives of the Saints, vol. 9 (revised ed.)
Camm, Bede (1931) Nine Martyr Monks
Challoner, Richard; John Hungerford Pollen, (ed.) (1924) Memoirs of Missionary Priests
Dodd, Charles (1739) Church History of England. Brussels
Gillow, Joseph (1885) Bibliographical Dictionary of English Catholics. London
Moss, Fletcher (1891) Didsbury. Manchester
Moss, Fletcher (1894) Chronicles of Cheadle, Cheshire. Didsbury
Moss, Fletcher (1903) Pilgrimages to Old Homes. Didsbury
New Catholic Encyclopedia (1967)
Rhodes, W. E. (ed.) (1909) The Apostolical Life of Ambrose Barlow. Manchester: Chetham Society

External links
University of Douai
Royal English College, Valladolid

1585 births
1641 deaths
People from Chorlton-cum-Hardy
English College, Douai alumni
English Benedictines
Benedictine martyrs
Benedictine saints
Catholic saints who converted from Protestantism
Converts to Roman Catholicism from Anglicanism
Forty Martyrs of England and Wales
Martyred Roman Catholic priests
English saints
English Roman Catholic saints
Executed people from Greater Manchester
People executed by Stuart England by hanging, drawing and quartering
17th-century English Roman Catholic priests
17th-century Roman Catholic martyrs
Executed Roman Catholic priests
Clergy from Manchester